Hostages is an American war film produced by Paramount Pictures and released in 1943.  It was directed by Frank Tuttle from a script by Frank Butler and Lester Cole based on the 1942 novel of the same name by Stefan Heym.  The film stars Luise Rainer, Arturo de Córdova, William Bendix and Paul Lukas and features Katina Paxinou and Oskar Homolka.

Plot
A group of 26 Czechoslovakian citizens are jailed as hostages by the Gestapo until the supposed killer of a Nazi officer – who actually committed suicide – is turned in. The hostages include the leader of the underground resistance movement (William Bendix), whose cover is that of an apparently ignorant washroom attendant in the nightclub where the victim was last seen alive.

Cast
 Luise Rainer as Milada Pressinger
 Arturo de Córdova as Paul Breda
 William Bendix as Underground leader
 Paul Lukas as Rheinhardt
 Katina Paxinou as Maria
 Oskar Homolka as Lev Pressinger
 Reinhold Schünzel as Kurt Daluege
 Frederick Gierrman as Captain Patzer
 Roland Varno as Jan Pavel
 Felix Basch as Dr. Wallerstein
 John Mylong as Proskosch
 Hans Conried as Lt. Glasenapp
 Steven Geray as Mueller

Production
Hostages utilized footage of Prague which was originally shot six years before for the film Bluebeard's Eighth Wife. Erich von Stroheim was originally scheduled to play the part of "Rheinhardt", but had to withdraw in order to film Paramount's Five Graves to Cairo.

References
Notes

External links

1943 films
1943 drama films
1940s English-language films
1940s war drama films
American black-and-white films
American war drama films
Films based on American novels
Films directed by Frank Tuttle
Films produced by Sol C. Siegel
Films scored by Victor Young
Films set in Prague
Paramount Pictures films
World War II films made in wartime
Czech resistance to Nazi occupation in film